Carlton Ettore Francesco Myers (born 30 March 1971) is an Italian former professional basketball player that played in the Italian league and the EuroLeague. Myers was initially raised in the United Kingdom. One of the best European shooting guards of his generation, he won a EuroBasket title with the senior Italian national team in 1999.

Early life
Myers was born in London, England to a Caribbean father from Saint Vincent and an Italian mother from Pesaro. He was raised in London until the age of 9, when he moved with his mother in Rimini, Italy.

Professional career
During his years in Fortitudo Bologna, Myers became the great rival of another European superstar, Saša Danilović, the leader of Virtus Bologna, the other basketball team in the city. The duels and the rivalry between Myers and Danilović, are a legendary part of Italian basketball history.

National team career
With the senior men's Italian National Team, Myers played in the 1997 and 1999 EuroBaskets, the 1998 FIBA World Championship, and in the 2000 Sydney Olympics, where he also had the honour of being his country's flag-bearer, at the opening ceremony.

Awards and accomplishments

Club
 2× Italian League MVP: 1994, 1997
 3× FIBA EuroStar: 1996, 1998, 1999
 FIBA EuroLeague Top Scorer: 1997
 Italian Cup winner: 1998
 Italian Cup MVP: 1998
 2× Italian Supercup winner: 1998, 2004
 FIBA EuroStars MVP: 1998
 FIBA EuroStars Top Scorer: 1998
 FIBA EuroStars 3-point Contest winner: 1998
 Italian League champion: 2000

National team
 : EuroBasket 1997
 : EuroBasket 1999
 EuroBasket 1999: All-Tournament Team

References

External links

 
FIBA Profile
FIBA Europe Profile
Euroleague.net Profile
Italian League Profile 
Spanish League Profile 
Eurobasket.com Profile
Carlton Myers, the 87-point man

1971 births
Living people
1998 FIBA World Championship players
Basketball players at the 2000 Summer Olympics
Basketball players from Greater London
Basket Rimini Crabs players
British expatriate basketball people in Spain
CB Valladolid players
English men's basketball players
English people of Italian descent
English people of Saint Vincent and the Grenadines descent
FIBA EuroBasket-winning players
Fortitudo Pallacanestro Bologna players
Italian expatriate basketball people in Spain
Italian men's basketball players
Italian people of Saint Vincent and the Grenadines descent
Lega Basket Serie A players
Liga ACB players
Mens Sana Basket players
Olympic basketball players of Italy
Pallacanestro Virtus Roma players
Shooting guards
Victoria Libertas Pallacanestro players
English emigrants to Italy
Sportspeople from Rimini